Germán Sequeira Aguilera (1884 – January 19, 1951) was a Nicaraguan politician. He was the 79th and 82nd mayor of El Sauce, León, Nicaragua. Before he was mayor, he attended medical school at the National Autonomous University of Nicaragua. He was a deputy in the National Assembly of Nicaragua during the presidency of José Maria Moncada and vice deputy during the presidency of Juan Bautista Sacasa. Sequeira was married to Graciela Delgado. Together, they had two children, Sabina and Germán. When Graciela died, Sequeira married Emerita Chavarria. They had eight children, Salvadora, Tomás, Noel, Maria de Lourdes, Pedro Alcides, Jesus, Anita, and Eli. Germán Sequeira died on January 19, 1951, in El Sauce.

1884 births
1951 deaths
Mayors of places in Nicaragua
National Autonomous University of Nicaragua alumni